The British Rail Class 41 were two powercars built in 1972 by British Rail Engineering Limited's Crewe Works to operate with the prototype High Speed Train (HST) with Mark 3 carriages.

History

Two power cars were built in 1972 by British Rail Engineering Limited's Crewe Works, numbered 41001 and 41002. They initially conducted tests on the East Coast Main Line with the set based at Neville Hill TMD.

On 5 May 1975, both entered revenue service on Great Western services between London Paddington and Bristol Temple Meads / Weston-super-Mare.

After the Class 252 re-classification they were renumbered into the carriage numbering range as 43000 and 43001.

After being replaced by production Class 43 HST powercars in the early 1980s, both were allocated to the Railway Technical Centre and used in various high speed trials associated with the Advanced Passenger Train and InterCity 225 projects. In December 1990, 41002 was scrapped by CF Booth in Rotherham, while 41001 was restored cosmetically and donated to the National Railway Museum.

In 2011, the National Railway Museum agreed a lease with the 125 Group that resulted in 41001 moving from York to Neville Hill TMD in March 2012 to be restored to operational condition. As part of this move, it was re-registered on TOPS as Class 43/9 locomotive 43000.

Upon completion it was based at the Great Central Railway (Nottingham). In November 2014, 41001 hauled its first passenger train since 1976, a special named the Screaming Valenta, using a short-formed East Midlands Trains HST set with a Class 43 on the other end.

After suffering engine problems at the Keighley & Worth Valley Railway in May 2019, it was moved to Neville Hill TMD for repairs.

In October 2019, the National Railway Museum announced it had terminated the loan agreement, citing serious contract breaches. Although that was disputed by the 125 Group, 41001 was returned to the museum in November 2019.

References

Further reading

External links

Testing the prototype HST

41 2
BREL locomotives
Bo-Bo locomotives
Railway locomotives introduced in 1972
Standard gauge locomotives of Great Britain
Diesel-electric locomotives of Great Britain